The Onslaught is the first studio album by American heavy metal band Lazarus A.D. It was released in 2007 as a self-produced album and re-released through Metal Blade records in 2009.

Track listing

Personnel 
 Jeff Paulick – lead vocals, bass
 Dan Gapen – lead guitar, vocals
 Alex Lackner – rhythm guitar
 Ryan Shutler – drums

References

2009 debut albums
Lazarus A.D. albums